John James Parker (3 May 1931 – 1 September 2003) was an Australian rules footballer who played in the Victorian Football League (VFL).

He was a half back in the Collingwood's 1953 premiership side and a centreman when the Magpies was defeated by Melbourne in the 1955 Grand Final.

References

External links

Australian rules footballers from Victoria (Australia)
Collingwood Football Club players
Collingwood Football Club Premiership players
1931 births
2003 deaths
One-time VFL/AFL Premiership players